Gogulapadu is a village in Palnadu district of the Indian state of Andhra Pradesh. It is located in Gurazala mandal of Gurazala revenue division.

History 
The famous battle Palnati Yudhdham (War of Palnadu) took place between Gurazala and Macherla between 1176 AD – 1182 AD at Karempudi (Yuddabhoomi).

Geography 

Governance 
Gogulapadu gram panchayat is the local self-government of the village.

Education 
As per the school information report for the academic year 2018–19, the village has 2 Zilla/Mandal Parishad schools.

References 

Villages in Palnadu district